Qintong Boat Festival is an annual event in Jiangyan, Jiangsu, China.

It has a long history since Ming Dynasty, and it is becoming an important tourist destination in the whole eastern China with the highlight of the Dragon Boat Racing.  Qintong Boat Festival is held in Qingming (around April 4–6) every year.  During the festival boats from nearby villages and towns converge in Xique lake for a few days of rejoicing.  Theatrical performances, dragon and lion dances, and other folk dances are staged right on board the boats.  It gathers about 300,000 people every year during the festival.

External links
 Official link

Festivals in China
Culture in Wuxi
Tourist attractions in Jiangsu
Boat festivals
Spring (season) events in China